Mount Eldridge could mean:

 Mount Eldridge (Alaska Range), a peak of the Alaska Range northeast of Mount McKinley (Denali)
 Mount Eldridge (Brooks Range), a peak in Alaska's Brooks Range
 Mount Eldridge (Idaho), a peak in Idaho's Bitterroot Range